Nissim ben Jacob (Hebrew: ניסים בן יעקב, also known as  Rav Nissim Gaon or in Hebrew: רבנו נסים, lit. Nissim our teacher; 990–1062), was a rabbi best known today for his Talmudic commentary ha-Mafteach, by which title he is also known.

Biography
Rav Nissim studied at the Kairouan yeshiva, initially under his father - Jacob ben Nissim ("Rav Yaakov Gaon") who had studied under Hai Gaon - and then under Chushiel, who succeeded as head of the Yeshiva. Nissim himself later became head of the yeshiva; in this capacity he is closely associated with Chananel son of Chushiel. His most famous student is probably Isaac Alfasi (the "Rif"). Rav Nissim maintained an active correspondence with Hai Gaon and with Shmuel Hanaggid, whose son Joseph married Nissim's only daughter (1049 CE).

Works
The commentary Sefer mafteaḥ le-manʻ ūlei ha-talmūd  (Hebrew: "The book of the key to unlocking the Talmud"; often, simply ha-Mafteach, (The Key), linked here) is essentially a Talmudic cross-reference. In it Rav Nissim identifies the sources for Mishnaic quotes, identifying obscure allusions to other places in Talmudic literature. He quotes from the Tosefta, Mekhilta, Sifre, Sifra, and from the Jerusalem Talmud, the explanations of which he sometimes prefers to those of the Babylonian Talmud. Nissim did not confine himself to quoting references, he also discusses these in connection with the text; this work is thus also a commentary. The work was written on several tractates, and is printed, in many editions, on the page itself.

Nissim also wrote other works, some of which have been lost, but which are quoted by later sages:
"Siddur Tefillah", a siddur (prayerbook)
A commentary on the Torah (now lost)
A "Sefer ha-Mitzvot" on the commandments (now lost)
 "Hilkhot Lulav" a polemic against the Karaites (now lost)
"Megillat Setarim":  a collection of notes concerning halakhic decisions, explanations, and midrashim, primarily a note-book for the author's private use, and published by his pupils probably not until after his death.
A collection of tales, "Sefer Ma'asiyyot ha-Hakhamim wehu Ḥibbur Yafeh meha-Yeshu'ah": about sixty tales, based upon the Mishnah, Baraita, the two Talmuds, and the midrashic writings; and written at the request of Nissim's father-in-law, Dunash, on the loss of his son.  This is translated into English as "An Elegant Compilation concerning Relief after Adversity" (Bibliography, below)

Literary portrayals
R. Nissim appears as a character in A Delightful Compendium of Consolation: A Fabulous Tale of Romance, Adventure and Faith in the Medieval Mediterranean, a novel by Burton Visotzky. The novel expands on the few known biographical facts (including the marriage of his daughter). Its title, A Delightful Compendium, derives from "Ḥibbur Yafeh".

See also
 History of the Jews in Kairouan
 History of the Jews in Tunisia

References

Bibliography
Nissim ben Jacob ibn Shahin, tr. William M. Brinner, An Elegant Composition concerning Relief after Adversity: Yale 1977 (Yale Judaica Series vol 20)

External links
Nissim ben Jacob ben Nissim ibn Shahin, jewishencyclopedia.com
Nissim ben Jacob, jewishhistory.org
 Sefer ha-Mafteah, Prof. Eliezer Segal
R' Nissim ben Yaakov z"l, torah.org

990 births
1062 deaths
People from Kairouan
Geonim
Maghrebi Jews
11th-century people of Ifriqiya
11th-century rabbis
Jews of Ifriqiya
10th-century people of Ifriqiya